Ritual is an album of contemporary classical music written by Keith Jarrett and performed by Dennis Russell Davies on solo piano. It was recorded in June 1977 and released by ECM Records in 1982.

Original notes
In the original notes for the CD release, pianist Dennis Russell Davies wrote about his relationship with Mr. Jarrett, his music, and how this project came about:

Critical reception
The Allmusic review by Richard S. Ginell awarded the album 3 stars, noting, "Ritual has several of the characteristics of Jarrett's solo improvisations -- the repetitive vamps and ostinatos, wistful lyricism, ruminative episodes developing organically out of what preceded them -- but without the jazzy/bluesy feeling that runs through the solo concerts. Also, the piece begins in a mournful way unusual for the usually optimistic Jarrett. In any case, it is a thoughtful, absorbing composition, thoroughly tonal harmonically, played with assured technique and appropriate use of classical expressive devices by Davies. Classical listeners as well as Jarrett devotees will find much to savor here".

Track listing
All compositions by Keith Jarrett
 "Ritual" - 18:37
 "Ritual" - 13:25

Personnel
Dennis Russell Davies – piano

Technical Personnel 
 Martin Wieland - recording engineer
 Signe Mähler - cover Photo
 Madeline Winkler-Betzendahl - liner photo
 Barbara Worjirsch - design
 Manfred Eicher - production

References

ECM Records albums
Keith Jarrett albums
Albums produced by Manfred Eicher
1977 albums